The Perfect Dictatorship is a 2014 Mexican comedy political satire film, written, produced and directed by Luis Estrada and starring Damián Alcázar, Alfonso Herrera, Joaquín Cosío, Dagoberto Gama, María Rojo and Salvador Sánchez. Cast also includes Osvaldo Benavides, Saúl Lisazo, Tony Dalton, Arath de la Torre, Sergio Mayer and Itatí Cantoral. It was released on October 16, 2014, and represented Mexico at the 2015 Goya Awards.

The film title is a reference to a famous statement by Peruvian writer Mario Vargas Llosa that he used to describe the continuous governments of the Institutional Revolutionary Party (PRI), which dominated politics in Mexico for much of the 20th century. The plot is based on the real life perceived Televisa controversy, which consisted of Mexican citizens heavily perceiving the news media was unfairly favoring PRI candidate Enrique Peña Nieto during the 2012 presidential election in Mexico.

Plot
The President of Mexico (based on Enrique Peña Nieto) is accepting the credential cards of the new United States Ambassador. During his speech he unexpectedly said a racist statement that becomes viral.

That same day officers of the Mexican government urges Television Mexicana, the most powerful television corporation, to create a media distraction by disclosing a scandalous story involving Governor Carmelo Vargas (Damián Alcazar) by showing a video where the Governor is accepting bribes from drug lords so the public turn their attention to the presidential situation and turn them to Governor Vargas scandal.

Governor Vargas decides to negotiate with Televisión Mexicana to clean his image as he addresses that its stellar newscast 24 horas en 30 minutos (24 hours in 30 minutes) is the only news source where the Mexican public can rely more than the internet or other TV shows.

TV MX's news producer Carlos Rojo and star reporter Ricardo Diaz are sent to meet Vargas and begin to show the good work the Governor had done in his state, just to be received by members of a drug cartel, that were sent by the Governor to protect them and even ask them to take a group picture with Diaz. Rojo also met a leader of the opposition party, Agustin Morales, who is going to ask in the Congress for the Governor's resignation, but then an attempt on the representative happens and Rojo decides to find news that would improve the image of Vargas instead.

Meanwhile, Ana and Elena Garza, a couple of twins, are kidnapped when their nanny is distracted. The information goes to the State Police and TV MX decides to cover the situation in the newscast by making the parents of the children, Lucia and Salvador, to sign a contract to ensure that they only provide information to TV MX while Carmelo Vargas sent some detectives to fake some interest in the case. The following of the news in 24 Horas en 30 minutos gets the full attention of the audiences to the point that is getting the same ratings than the telenovela Los Pobres Tambien Aman (a parody for Los Ricos Tambien Lloran) while covering all the injustices that are being committed.

Recovered from his attempt, Agustin Morales obtains from the Governor's spokesman and godson the contracts that has TV MX with the governor, so Morales goes with Rojo to ask him to have 10 minutes in the newscast. Rojo ask his boss, Jose Hartman, about it while concerned about the information Morales has, but he got the authorization. Meanwhile, Vargas learns about what his spokesman did, so he kills him himself in front of Carlos. Meanwhile when Morales is being interviewed, the newscast show evidences that he is blamed by violating and corrupting children. Morales felt his image is being damaged and get angry so he is removed from the studio, later in his hotel he tries to record a video to provide the evidences but he is killed, something that is managed as a suicide by both the Government and TV MX.

When a witness recognizes who kidnapped the children, TV MX changed the strategy and begin in the newscast to ask the people to send donations to the foundation "Si Se puede" (Yes We Can), so the money can be used to pay for the ransom the kidnappers are asking (one million dollars), even to the point of the governor himself donating a high sum (while asking Rojo  a favor in exchange). However, Doña Chole, a member of the kidnappers band decides to bring the twins to the police and the family decides to not give any more interviews to TV MX, so the history is left without an end. So TV MX decides to make a fake montage over an operative of the government to rescue the girls and finally give the ending the people wanted to see, put Vargas as a hero and the family Garza supporting his heroic actions.

After the president congratulates Vargas for his actions, then he is asked about the rise of the prices in the basic products, he answers "I am not the Mistress in my house" and he is not able to predict the real impact on familiar economies. This puts the host, Perez Harris, to burst in a big laugh, so the newscast is stopped and Perez Harris is being detained by the government agents.

The next day, Ricardo becomes the host of the newscast and he receives the note from Rojo that he needs to input a very urgent news to remove attention over the last President´s mistake by announcing the visit of the Pope Francis to Mexico. Meanwhile the commercials shows the unity of the nation and Vargas decides to run for President while marrying Jazmin, the star of Los Pobres Tambien Aman (and former girlfriend of Rojo, the favor he asked).

Two years later, we learn that Vargas put together the most important politic parties of the time (PAN, PRI, PRD) to win the elections making Jazmin the First Lady, while the Garza twins sign a contract with TV MX to be the stars of the newest telenovela.

Cast

Reception
The film has grossed over MXN$188.16 million in Mexico, making it the eighth highest-grossing Mexican film of all time.

Awards and nominations

Ariel Awards
The Ariel Awards are awarded annually by the Mexican Academy of Film Arts and Sciences in Mexico. La Dictadura Perfecta received 10 nominations.

|-
|rowspan="12" scope="row"| 2015
|scope="row"| La Dictadura Perfecta
|scope="row"| Best Picture
|rowspan="11" scope="row" style="background: #FDD; color: black| Nominated
|-
|rowspan="2" scope="row"| Luis Estrada
|scope="row"| Best Director
|-
|rowspan="2" scope="row"| Best Original Screenplay
|-
|rowspan="1" scope="row"| Jaime Sampietro
|-
|scope="row"|  Santiago Núñez, Pablo Lach and Hugo de la Cerda
|rowspan="1" scope="row"| Best Sound
|-
|scope="row"| Mariana Rodríguez
|rowspan="1" scope="row"| Best Film Editing
|-
|scope="row"| Salvador Parra
|rowspan="1" scope="row"| Best Art Direction
|-
|scope="row"| Felipe Salazar
|rowspan="1" scope="row"| Best Makeup
|-
|scope="row"| Mariestela Fernández
|rowspan="1" scope="row"| Best Costume Design
|-
|scope="row"| Alejandro Vázquez
|rowspan="1" scope="row"| Best Special Effects
|-
|scope="row"| Adriana Arriaga
|rowspan="1" scope="row"| Best Visual Effects
|-

References

External links
 
 

2014 comedy films
2014 films
Films directed by Luis Estrada
2010s Spanish-language films
Mexican political satire films
2010s Mexican films